In the geological timescale, the Ludlow Epoch (from 427.4 ± 0.5 million years ago to 423.0 ± 2.3 million years ago) occurred during the Silurian Period, after the end of the Homerian Age. It is named for the town of Ludlow in Shropshire, England.

The Ludlow Epoch is subdivided into two stages: Gorstian and Ludfordian.

Paleontology

Arthropods

See also
Ludlow Group

References

 
03
Geological epochs